The 1978–79 season was Colchester United's 37th season in their history and second successive season in third tier of English football, the Third Division. Alongside competing in the Third Division, the club also participated in the FA Cup and the League Cup.

Colchester improved on their previous league campaign by one position, finishing in a strong seventh. The U's were eliminated in the League Cup by Charlton Athletic in the first round, but had greater success in the FA Cup. They saw off Oxford United, Leatherhead, Darlington and Newport County before facing Manchester United in the fifth round of the competition at Layer Road. Colchester held on until the 86th-minute before Jimmy Greenhoff broke the deadlock and denied the U's an Old Trafford replay.

Season overview
Bobby Roberts kept the faith in his squad for their second season in the Third Division, but an injury to Eddie Rowles forced him into the transfer market. Despite Colchester suffering financial difficulty, the club spent £15,000 on Millwall forward Trevor Lee, who became the first black player to represent Colchester's first team.

A strong season in the league saw the club finish one position higher than the previous campaign in seventh, narrowly falling short of the promotion places – nine points behind third-placed Swansea City. In the final game of the season, Colchester recorded their then highest-ever away league victory with a 5–1 win at Tranmere Rovers, less than a month after they had stunned champions-elect Watford 3–0 at Vicarage Road on Good Friday.

Colchester had a productive run in the FA Cup, where they disposed of Oxford United 4–2 with Bobby Gough netting a hat-trick. They defeated non-League Leatherhead 4–0 in a replay, and overcame difficult away ties at Darlington and Newport County. In the fifth road, the U's welcomed First Division Manchester United to Layer Road. After the fixture was called off from its original Saturday date, the crowd of 13,171 saw the U's come four minutes within an Old Trafford replay after Jimmy Greenhoff finally broke the deadlock after 86-minutes to send Colchester out.

Players

Transfers

In

 Total spending:  ~ £40,000

Out

 Total incoming:  ~ £8,000

Match details

Third Division

Results round by round

League table

Matches

League Cup

FA Cup

Squad statistics

Appearances and goals

|-
!colspan="14"|Players who appeared for Colchester who left during the season

|}

Goalscorers

Disciplinary record

Clean sheets
Number of games goalkeepers kept a clean sheet.

Player debuts
Players making their first-team Colchester United debut in a fully competitive match.

See also
List of Colchester United F.C. seasons

References

General
Books

Websites

Specific

1978-79
English football clubs 1978–79 season